{{safesubst:#invoke:RfD||2=Nonexistent FMR stations|month = March
|day =  7
|year = 2023
|time = 03:55
|timestamp = 20230307035548

|content=
REDIRECT Philippine Collective Media Corporation

}}